Martin Desmond Roe is a British-American film and television director, writer, and producer. He is best known for Buzkashi Boys (2012), Kobe Bryant's Muse (2015), Breaking2 (2017), Tom vs Time (2018), and We are the Champions (2020). Roe is the founder and Creative Director of Dirty Robber, a Los Angeles-based production company.

Martin Roe's short film Two Distant Strangers was met with critical acclaim; at the 93rd Academy Awards, it received the Academy Award for Best Live Action Short Film.

Education
Born in Bristol, England, Roe studied Latin and Ancient Greek at Somerville College, Oxford, graduating in 2001 with a BA in Classics. He moved to Los Angeles and entered the USC School of Cinematic Arts, earning an MFA in Cinema and Television in 2008.

Career
Roe became interested in filmmaking and storytelling while staging plays during his time at Oxford. After finishing USC film school he founded Dirty Robber, a production company. His first major success came in 2012 when Roe co-wrote the screenplay for Buzkashi Boys, a short film that was directed by Sam French. Written in a week, on location in Kabul, Afghanistan, the film was inspired by the true life story of Fawad Mohammidi, a homeless 14 year old street vendor and explored his friendship with another boy and their love for the traditional horse sport Buzkashi. Buzkashi Boys gained critical acclaim winning numerous film festival awards, and was nominated for the 2013 Best Live Action Short Film at the Academy Awards.

In 2017, after directing a number of commercials for Nike, Inc., Roe was invited as creative lead on Breaking2 sports documentary, a joint project of Nike and National Geographic in association with Dirty Robber. The documentary short followed three world class athletes, Eliud Kipchoge, Lelisa Desisa, and Zersenay Tadese as they attempted to run a marathon in under two hours. Breaking2 won several awards in advertising industry including a Gold Lion at the Cannes Lions International Festival of Creativity. Roe also took part as an executive producer of 6 episodes for Tom vs Time, a collaborative web television series project directed by Gotham Chopra, which won Emmy Award for Outstanding Serialized Sports Documentary (NBC Sports). In 2020, he co-directed the short film Two Distant Strangers, about police killings in the United States, which stars Joey Bada$$ and Andrew Howard, and which won the Academy Award for Best Live Action Short in 2021.

Roe is an owner and creative director of Dirty Robber Productions, a Los Angeles-based company with the focus on documentaries, T.V series, shows and sports events. Among Dirty Robber's most notable productions are Religion of Sports, Tom vs Time, Kobe Bryant’s Muse (in collaboration with Kobe Inc.), Why We Fight (ESPN+), Wiz Khalifa: Behind the Cam (DIRECTV), and We are the Champions, a documentary series about various contests and sports traditions.

Filmography

References

External links
Martin Roe Filmography

American documentary filmmakers
American film producers
USC School of Cinematic Arts alumni
Alumni of Somerville College, Oxford
University of Southern California alumni
Living people
Year of birth missing (living people)
Directors of Live Action Short Film Academy Award winners